Rutgers University School of Nursing is the nursing school at Rutgers University, with headquarters in Newark and additional campuses at New Brunswick, and Blackwood, New Jersey.As one of the nation’s largest, most comprehensive nursing schools, Rutgers School of Nursing is dedicated to the pursuit of excellence in education, research, evidence-based health care delivery, and the promotion of community health.

Rutgers University School of Nursing was established on July 1, 2014, with the unification of Rutgers College of Nursing and School of Nursing at University of Medicine and Dentistry of New Jersey; it was renamed Rutgers School of Nursing. Built on a solid foundation established by committed faculty, dedicated staff, and passionate students, Rutgers School of Nursing has and continues to strengthen nursing education and the profession.

History

Rutgers College of Nursing 
Rutgers College of Nursing was involved in the education of nurses since the early 1940s when the Newark and Camden campuses offered courses in public health nursing. The nursing program at the Newark campus, located in Ackerson Hall, was established in 1952 with funds allocated by Governor Alfred E. Driscoll of New Jersey. In 1955, the School of Nursing (as it was referred to at the time) received accreditation by the National League for Nursing. on March 6, 1956, the School of Nursing became the College of Nursing. Ella V. Stonsby, first director of the School of Nursing, was appointed the first dean of the college. 

In 1955, a master's level program in psychiatric nursing was established with support from a grant from the National Institute of Mental Health. In 1974 a master's programs in community health nursing, parent/child nursing, and medical/surgical nursing were added. in 1989 a doctor of philosophy program in nursing was approved by the New Jersey Board of Higher Education.

Nursing student activities
 Rutgers Student Nurses’ Association, Chapter of the NJ Nursing Students, Inc. and NJ State Nurses Association 
 Rutgers Graduate Student Association 
 Alpha Tau Chapter of Sigma, International Honor Society of Nursing 
 Graduate Nursing Student Academy at the American Association of Colleges of Nursing 
 American Association for Men in Nursing 
 National Association of Hispanic Nurses, New Jersey Chapter 
 Philippine Nurses Association of New Jersey 
 Northern New Jersey Black Nurses Association 
 New Jersey Integrated Black Nurses Association 
 Chi Eta Phi Sorority, Inc.

References

External links
 Official website
 Rutgers—Camden Nursing Official website

Nursing schools in New Jersey
Rutgers University colleges and schools